WDBO may refer to the following radio or TV stations licensed to Orlando, Florida, United States:

 WDBO (AM), a radio station (580 AM)
 WOEX, a radio station (96.5 FM), which held the call sign WDBO-FM from 2011 to 2020
 WWKA, a radio station (92.3 FM), that originally used the WDBO-FM call sign until 1982.
 WKMG-TV, a television station (virtual channel 6), which held the call sign WDBO-TV from 1954 to 1982